The 1965–66 National Hurling League was the 35th season of the National Hurling League.

Division 1

Tipperary came into the season as defending champions of the 1964-65 season. Laois joined Division 1 as the promoted team.

On 18 September 1966, Kilkenny won the title after a 10-15 to 2-15 aggregate win over New York in the final. It was their 3rd league title overall and their first since 1961-62.

In spite of finishing at the bottom of their respective groups, neither Galway of Laois were relegated.

Tipperary's Jimmy Doyle was the Division 1 top scorer with 4-20.

Division 1A table

Group stage

Division 1B table

Group stage

Play-off

Knock-out stage

Semi-finals

Home final

Finals

Scoring statistics

Top scorers overall

Top scorers in a single game

Miscellaneous

 Kilkenny's defeat of Tipperary in the league decider is their first defeat of Tipperary in a national final since the 1922 All-Ireland final.

Division 2

On 24 April 1966, Offaly won the title after a 4-11 to 3-9 win over Kerry in the final.

Division 2A table

Division 2B table

Knock-out stage

Semi-finals

Final

Division 3

On 9 October 1966, Mayo won the title after a 1-12 to 1-8 win over Armagh in the final.

Knock-out stage

Semi-final

Final

References

National Hurling League seasons
Lea
Lea